Beresford County is one of the 141 Cadastral divisions of New South Wales. It contains Cooma and Bredbo. Part of the Murrumbidgee River forms the boundary in the north-west, and a separate part of the river forms part of the western boundary.

Beresford County was named in honour of Viscount William Carr Beresford (1768-1854).

Parishes within this county
A full list of parishes found within this county; their current LGA and mapping coordinates to the approximate centre of each location is as follows:

References

Counties of New South Wales